The men's 50 m apnoea competition in finswimming at the 2005 World Games took place on 22 July 2005 at the Schwimmstadion in Sportpark Wedau in
Duisburg, Germany.

Competition format
A total of 18 athletes entered the competition. The best eight athletes from preliminary round qualifies to the final.

Results

Preliminary

Final

References

External links
 Results on IWGA website

Finswimming at the 2005 World Games